Loco Live is the second live album by American punk band the Ramones.

There are two different versions of Loco Live available. The 1991 Chrysalis version contains 33 songs, including "Too Tough to Die", "Don't Bust My Chops", "Palisades Park", and "Love Kills". The 1992 Sire version has different cover art and track order, and replaced these four tracks with "I Just Wanna Have Something to Do", "Havana Affair", "I Don't Wanna Go Down to the Basement", and an unlisted "Carbona Not Glue". The original tracks were recorded digitally at the Sala Zeleste in Barcelona, Spain on March 11–12, 1991 and overdubbed at Electric Lady Studios in NYC. This is the first Ramones album to feature C.J. Ramone.

Track listing
All songs were written by the Ramones except where indicated. Credits have been given to specific members where applicable.

1991 Chrysalis version (CD) Concert 11th March 1991

1992 Sire version (CD) Concert 12th March 1991

2010 Captain Oi! version (2xCD)
The Captain Oi! edition contains all of the songs from both versions.

Personnel

Ramones
Joey Ramone - lead vocals
Johnny Ramone - guitar
C. J. Ramone - bass, backing vocals, lead vocals on "Wart Hog" and "Love Kills"
Marky Ramone - drums

Production
Hal Belknap - mixing assistant
George Bodnar - photography
Shannon Carr - mixing assistant
Debbie Harry - liner notes
John Heiden - design
Arturo Vega - artwork, design, photography
Howie Weinberg - mastering
Jeff Wormley - assistant engineer
Adam Yellin - recording, mixing, producer

Charts

References

Ramones live albums
1991 live albums
Chrysalis Records live albums